FC Pinzgau Saalfelden is an Austrian football club from Saalfelden in the federal state of Salzburg. The club currently plays in the Austrian Regionalliga Salzburg which is the third tier of Austrian football, and has played there since the 2014–15 season.

History
FC Pinzgau Saalfelden was founded on 23 May 2007 after the merger of the town's football clubs 1. Saalfeldner SK (founded in 1947) and ESV Saalfelden (founded in 1952), although the two clubs had previous partnered as SG Saalfelden from 2004 to 2007.

Players

Current squad
''

Notable former players

  Andrew Brody
  Josh Heard
  Bienvenue Kanakimana
  Norbert Németh
  Sean Okoli
  Pablo Ruiz

Honours
 Salzburger Liga: 2010-11, 2013–14

Other websites 
FC Pinzgau

References

Football clubs in Austria
Association football clubs established in 2007
2007 establishments in Austria